is a Rinzai temple in Jōnan-ku, Fukuoka, Japan.

Shōkaku-ji was founded in the Nara period by Seiga, who came from India as a priest during the period. He made a Buddhist hermitage and found white camellias in the mountain. He cropped them and created a pair of Bodhisattva Kannon statues, enshrining one in this temple. It is said to be told the first process of kerosene by squeezing oil from camellia seeds in Japan. Both have been derived from the word of Mount Abura and the temple. Initially, it was called as Senpuku-ji (泉福寺).

In 1193, Bencho, the priest of the Chinzei branch of Jōdo-shū Buddhism, has entered the temple and was teaching his disciples. Along with the Tenpuku-ji Temple on the west side of the mountain, it flourished home to monks and it is said to have lined up to 360 priest living quarters around the temple. In the Tenshō era, however, the temple was burnt down in the fire caused by war. Then in the Genroku era, it has been rebuilt various buildings such as kannon-dō hall, the reception hall, a bell tower, living quarters and so on. In 1694, it was changed to the present name, Shōkaku-ji.

The wooden Avalokiteśvara statue is the subject of mountainous faith that has been enshrined in the main hall. It has been designated the Cultural Properties of Japan by the government in 1906. The Buddha statue theft occurred on October 4, 2009. The robbery entered the temple and he took it from the main hall. However, it was discovered after three months in December of the same year. Remaining from his shoes mark, there are some criminals who was involved in the case of statue theft, it is estimated that stolen by cutting the main hall of the padlock.

The Hibari Kannon-dō hall was built in 1994 which the hall was dedicated to Hibari Misora, a Japanese singer who died on June 24, 1989.

The Aburayama porridge opening ceremony will be held on February 1 every year. According to the state of red bean porridge that has been allowed to stand in the main hall for 15 days from the Lunar New Year, it is the event to predict the weather and the crop conditions of the year.

Important Cultural Properties
The 78 meter wooden Avalokiteśvara statue is the work of the Nanboku-chō period.

References

External links
Cultural assets of Fukuoka:Shōkaku-ji - Fukuoka City Economic and Tourism and Cultural Affairs 

Buddhist temples in Fukuoka Prefecture
Rinzai school
Buildings and structures in Fukuoka
Tourist attractions in Fukuoka